Christopher Mayer (born George Charles Mayer III; February 21, 1954 – July 23, 2011), also known as Chip Mayer, was an American film and TV actor who was best known for portraying Vance Duke on The Dukes of Hazzard for 19 episodes during season 5 when cousins Coy and Vance Duke temporarily replaced Bo and Luke Duke (due to a salary dispute between producers and the original actors).

Career
Mayer played the role of Vance Duke in 19 episodes of the fifth season of The Dukes of Hazzard during 1982–83. Mayer continued his work in television and movies into the early 1990s, including a stint on the daytime serial Santa Barbara. He also played Kenneth Falk in the film Liar Liar (1997) alongside Jim Carrey. He appeared on Star Trek: Deep Space Nine, season 7, episode 15, "Badda Bing Badda Bang" as a security guard in 1999. His last TV credit was a guest appearance on 18 Wheels of Justice in 2000.

Personal life
Mayer's first marriage was to actress Teri Copley, with whom he had a daughter, Ashley. Mayer's second marriage was to Eileen Davidson, an actress on the daytime serials Days of Our Lives and The Young and the Restless. Mayer's third marriage was to actress Shauna Sullivan in 1988, with whom he had two more daughters, Alexandra and Angelica. Mayer was engaged to be married to Catherine Irvine at the time of his death.

Mayer was found dead of natural causes in his Los Angeles home in Sherman Oaks on July 23, 2011.

Filmography

References

External links

1954 births
2011 deaths
American male film actors
American male soap opera actors
American male television actors
Male actors from New York City
20th-century American male actors